Mark Jeffrey Radford (born July 5, 1959) is an American former National Basketball Association player who played from 1981 to 1983. He played in college for Oregon State University from 1977 to 1981, and was drafted in the third round (53rd overall) of the 1981 NBA draft by the Seattle SuperSonics. He played in 97 career games over two seasons for the SuperSonics. Mark Radford has two children, Armin and Nina, the latter of which went on to play collegiate basketball for Northern Arizona University.

References

External links
 Database Basketball - Mark Radford stats

1959 births
Living people
American men's basketball players
Basketball players from Tacoma, Washington
Oregon State Beavers men's basketball players
Seattle SuperSonics draft picks
Seattle SuperSonics players
Shooting guards
Wyoming Wildcatters players